This is the discography of British pop band Prefab Sprout.

Albums

Studio albums

Compilation albums

Box sets

Video albums

EPs

Singles

References

Discographies of British artists
Pop music group discographies
New wave discographies